CJAY-FM (CJAY 92) is a Canadian radio station that broadcasts an active rock format at 92.1 FM in Calgary, Alberta. The station uses its on-air brand name as CJAY 92 and is owned by Bell Media. CJAY operates repeater transmitters located in Banff and Invermere, British Columbia. Its founder was Ralph Connor, who moved to Calgary from Sudbury, Ontario to start the station.

History
CJAY was owned by Standard Broadcasting until 2007, when Standard Radio was acquired by Astral from Standard Broadcasting due to Standard's exit from terrestrial broadcasting. As part of Astral's merger with Bell Media on June 27, 2013, CJAY is now owned by Bell Media.

By September 2010, CJAY changed its logo and slogan, as well as format from mainstream rock to active rock, similar to then-sister station CKQB-FM in Ottawa.

On June 2, 2018, CJAY's studios relocated from their Centre Street location where they had been for 15 years back to their original location on Broadcast Hill, while its transmitter is located at Old Banff Coach Road and 85 Street Southwest.

CJAY is currently home to Mornings with Jesse (Modz) and JD (Lewis), Reaper and Chris Foord.

Rebroadcasters

References

External links
 CJAY 92
 Canadian Broadcast Standards Council 2004 decision against CJAY
 Recent (2005) radio ratings for major Canadian markets
 CJAY history - Canadian Communications Foundation
 
 
 
 

Jay
Jay
Jay
Radio stations established in 1977
1977 establishments in Alberta